The Philips SAA1099 sound generator is a 6-voice sound chip used by some 1980s devices. It can produce several different waveforms by locking the volume envelope generator to the frequency generator, and also has a noise generator with 3 pre-set frequencies which can be locked to the frequency generator for greater range. It can output audio in fully independent stereo.

Uses 
 The British-made SAM Coupé computer
 The Creative Music System (C/MS) by Creative Labs, which was also marketed at RadioShack as the Game Blaster. They had 2 chips, for 12 voices.
 The Creative Sound Blaster 1.0 card (and 1.5 and 2.0 as an optional addon) also had Game Blaster features. These cards also had an OPL2 chip (aka YM3812), which became much more popular.
 Silicon Graphics used it on the IO2 and IO3 board for sound generation. Although this feature was almost never documented or used, the SAA1099 is present and usable if addressed directly.

External links 
 Documentation
 SAA1099 emulator for Windows and a few demo tunes
 SAA1099 emulation library
 The Old SGI audio
Sound chips